Bombieri's theorem may refer to:

Bombieri–Vinogradov theorem, a result in analytic number theory
Schneider–Lang theorem for Bombieri's theorem on transcendental numbers